Bus Bai Bas Ladies Special is an Indian television chat show in Marathi language originally aired on Zee Marathi. It was hosted by Subodh Bhave.

Concept 
The show invited women celebrity guests every week to talk about their personalities, bond,  controversies, relations, etc.

Celebrity Guests 
 Supriya Sule
 Amruta Khanvilkar
 Amruta Fadnavis
 Medha Manjrekar
 Pankaja Munde
 Shruti Marathe
 Kranti Redkar
 Pooja Sawant
 Hruta Durgule
 Kishori Pednekar
 Surekha Punekar
 Amruta Subhash
 Sai Tamhankar
 Usha Nadkarni
 Shreya Bugade
 Sonalee Kulkarni
 Rinku Rajguru
 Vishakha Subhedar
 Priya Bapat
 Shreegauri Sawant
 Sonali Kulkarni
 Shubhangi Gokhale
 Prarthana Behere
 Sayali Sanjeev Chandsarkar

References

External links 
 
 Bus Bai Bas Ladies Special at ZEE5

Zee Marathi original programming
Marathi-language television shows
Indian reality television series
2022 Indian television series debuts
2022 Indian television series endings